Bid Sorkh (also Romanized as Bīd Sorkh) is a village in Sahneh Rural District, in the Central District of Sahneh County, Kermanshah Province, Iran. At the 2006 census, its population was 757, in 181 families.

References 

Populated places in Sahneh County